Banat Airport Caransebeș or Aeroportul Caransebeș  is located  east northeast of Caransebeș in western Romania, in Caraș-Severin County. A former military base, this was the only commercial airport in Romania not located in the proximity of a large urban area.

The airport has been open for national traffic since May 2020. The airport management together with authorities are working to open the airport for international traffic.

Banat Aviation Academy 
The Banat Aviation Academy is located on the airport premises.

Aircraft Parking 

 There is a large capacity of parking for aircraft. The management estimate that approximately 45 Airbus A320s or 65 ATR 72s may be parked in the airport.

Airlines and destinations
Currently there is no regular service to this airport. In 1994 TAROM suspended its direct flights from Aurel Vlaicu International Airport in Bucharest, and in 2002 the airport was bought by a private company. In 2019 the owner changed and in 2020 they opened for traffic .

See also
Aviation in Romania
Transport in Romania

References

External links
 Google Map - Aerial View

Airports in Romania
Buildings and structures in Caraș-Severin County
Airports established in 1969
Caransebeș